The 1829 Rhode Island gubernatorial election was an uncontested election held on April 15, 1829 to elect the Governor of Rhode Island. James Fenner, the incumbent governor and Jacksonian Party nominee, was the only candidate and so won with 100% of the vote.

General election

Candidates
James Fenner, Governor since 1824.

Results

References

Rhode Island gubernatorial elections
1829 Rhode Island elections
Rhode Island
April 1829 events